Johanna Westberg (born 6 April 1990) is a Swedish retired handball player, who last played for Nykøbing HK and the Swedish national team.

She's the twin sister of teammate Emelie Westberg. Her debut in the national team was 2012 against France. She played in the European Championship 2012 for Sweden. In 2017 she won the danish championship with Nykøbing Falster Håndboldklub.

Achievements 
 2009 Gold with Skuru IK in Swedish youth championship.
 2014 Final in the swedish championship with Skuru IK.
Carpathian Trophy:
Winner: 2015
 2017 Winner in danish championship with Nykøbing Falster Håndboldklub

References

1990 births
Living people
Swedish female handball players
People from Nacka Municipality
Expatriate handball players
Swedish expatriate sportspeople in Denmark
Nykøbing Falster Håndboldklub players
Handball players at the 2020 Summer Olympics
Olympic handball players of Sweden
Twin sportspeople
Swedish twins
Sportspeople from Stockholm County